Bhairabkunda Shiva Mandir or Daifam Shiv Mandir  is one of the most important Hindu temples in Bhutan. It is located in the south east corner of Bhutan near the town of Jomotsangkha (Daifam). It is located 24km from the Indian town of Udalguri in Assam.
   
According the Shiva Mahapurana and the Swasthani Brata Katha, after he death of his beloved  Sati Devi or Dakshayani, Lord Shiva wandered the earth carrying her corpse on his shoulder. As he wandered, parts of her body fell to earth at different places on the Indian subcontinent. Each of the 51 (sometimes 108) places where  her body parts fell, became sacred sites known as Shakti Peetha, or seat of Shakti. One such Shakti Peeth is identified by many as the Bhairab Kunda.

Later the King of the Gods, Lord Indra descended here on his celestial white elephant Airavata and blessed this place by meditating here for many years. After Indra carried out many fire rituals, Lord Shiva blessed the place with rain.  Today it is said that whenever a fire ritual is conducted here, rain immediately falls in  Bhairabkunda.

There is a cave located just below the present temple where it is said Lord Shiva meditated and a lake (Kunda) was formed near the site of his meditation. Years later, Bhairab Nath, a fierce manifestation of Lord Shiva was meditating at the same place he discovered a natural Shiva Ling and the place got its name Bhairabkunda (or "Bhairav Lake").

The Bhairab Kunda lake itself lies at the tri-junction of the Bhutanese district of Samdrup Jongkhar and the Indian states of Assam and Arunachel Pradesh. Here the Jampani River, originating in Bhutan and the Bhairabi River merge in to form the Dhansiri River a major tributary of Brahmaputra. During Makar Sankranti, devotees visit the temple and take a holy bath in the kunda at the meeting point of the rivers and offer puja to Lord Shiva.

References

Hindu temples in Bhutan
Shakti Peethas
Samdrup Jongkhar District